Sean McDermott (born 1974) is an American football coach.

Sean McDermott or Sean MacDermott may also refer to:

 Sean McDermott (basketball) (born 1996), American basketball player
 Sean McDermott (footballer) (born 1993), Irish association footballer
 Sean McDermott (long snapper) (born 1976), former American football long snapper
 Seán MacDermott or Seán Mac Diarmada (1882–1916), Irish political activist